Fuzz may refer to:

 Fuzz (film), a 1972 American comedy
 Fuzz: When Nature Breaks the Law, a nonfiction book by Mary Roach
 The fuzz, a slang term for police officers

Music
 Fuzz (electric guitar), distortion effects to create "warm" and "dirty" sounds
 Fuzz (band), a garage rock band featuring Ty Segall, Charles Moothart and Chad Ubovich
 Fuzz (Fuzz album), their 2013 debut studio album
 The Fuzz (band), a 1970s American female vocal trio
 The Fuzz (album), their 1970 debut album
 Fuzz (Alice Donut album), 2006 punk album
 Fuzz (Junkhouse album), 1996 rock album
 "Fuzz", a 2007 song by Japanese rock band Mucc

People
 Fuzz White (1916–2003), Major League Baseball player
 Calvin "Fuzz" Jones (1926–2010), American electric blues bassist and singer
 Steve "Fuzz" Kmak (born 1970), American bassist who formerly played in the heavy metal band Disturbed
 Fuzz Scoota, American underground rapper who performs with D12
 Fuzz Townshend (born 1964), British drummer
 María Fernanda Malo (born 1985), Mexican actress also known as Fuzz
 James "Fuzz" San Giovanni, American musician who performs in Deep Banana Blackout

See also
Fuzzy (disambiguation)
 Fuzzing or fuzz testing, automated software testing technique